Please don't delete this article because this actor or actress is new and will play/is playing a lead, supporting or breakthrough role in the tokusatsu series "Kamen Rider Build" and will continue their career and make more roles, either lead or supporting, after the end of the programme.

 is a Japanese actress and tarento. She is represented the agency Rising Production.

Biography
From her elementary to junior high school years she took lessons at the "Carles Vocals & Dance School Osaka School".

Scouted to her current office at the age of 13, and debuting in 2001, she starred in the film Star Light. Also, she was also an exclusive model since the launch of the fashion magazine Love Berry in December of the same year. In the April 2005 issue she graduated along with Chieko Ochi, Miyuu Sawai, Mizuho Oda, etc.

Personal life
She has an older brother.
Her hobby is collecting dolphin goods. When shooting a photo album, she was able to take two shots with a real dolphin and she was very glad. Also, her cameras and photographs are authentic, in which she used in developing films herself, and they are also introduced in her blogs.
Special skills are swimming, figure skating, and dressing. She learned figure skating from the age of five and practiced well in the rink that Nobunari Oda skated.
Yu Fujisaki of rock band Negoto, and Aina Yamauchi of Silent Siren, are people she deeply interact with in the music industry such as their songwriter's universe, and she often participated in their live concerts and music festivals. Also, she gets along with Yurie Midori and Erina Matsui as well, and often appear on their blogs.

Works

Videos

Filmography

Films

TV dramas

Variety, information programmes

Stage

Advertisements

Bibliography

Photo albums

Magazines

References

External links 

 
 – Ameba Blog (14 October 2011 – ) 
 
 

1987 births
Living people
Actresses from Osaka